Martha Tabram (née White; 10 May 1849 – 7 August 1888) was an English woman killed in a spate of violent murders in and around the Whitechapel district of East London between 1888 and 1891. She may have been the first victim of the still-unidentified Jack the Ripper.

Although not one of the canonical five Ripper victims who historians have broadly acknowledged, she is considered the next most likely candidate.

Early life
Tabram was born Martha White in Southwark, London, on 10 May 1849. She was the youngest of five children born to Charles Samuel White, a warehouseman, and his wife, Elisabeth Dowsett. Her older siblings (in order of birth) included Henry White, Stephen White, Esther White and Mary Ann White. She was 5 feet 3 inches tall and had dark hair.

In May 1865, her parents separated; six months later her father died suddenly. Later she went to live with Henry Samuel Tabram, a foreman packer at a furniture warehouse. The two married on 25 December 1869. In 1871 the couple moved to a house close to Martha's childhood home. She and Henry had two sons: Frederick John Tabram (born February 1871) and Charles Henry Tabram (born December 1872).

The marriage was troubled, due to Martha's drinking, which was heavy enough to cause alcoholic fits, and her husband left her in 1875. For about three years he paid her an allowance of 12 shillings a week, then reduced this to two shillings and sixpence when he heard she was living with another man.

Tabram lived on and off with Henry Turner, a carpenter, from about 1876 until three weeks before her death. This relationship was also troubled by Martha's drinking and occasionally staying out all night. She, and her sons, were listed as being overnight inmates at the Whitechapel Union workhouse's casual ward at Thomas Street on the census night of 1881. By 1888 Turner was out of regular employment and the couple earned income by selling trinkets and other small articles on the streets, while lodging for about four months at 4 Star Place, off Commercial Road in Whitechapel. Around the beginning of July, they left abruptly, owing rent, and separated for the last time about the middle of that month. Tabram moved to a common lodging house at 19 George Street, Spitalfields. By the time of her death, Tabram's economic situation had become so desperate that she was forced to trade sex for money on the streets.

6 August 1888

On 6 August 1888, the night before her murder, Tabram was drinking ale and rum with another woman, and some-time prostitute, Mary Ann Connelly, known as "Pearly Poll", and two soldiers in a public house, the Angel and Crown, close to George Yard Buildings. The four of them paired off, left the public house and separated at approximately 11:45 p.m., each woman with her own client. Martha and her client went to George Yard, a narrow north-south alley connecting Wentworth Street and Whitechapel High Street, entered from Whitechapel High Street by a covered archway next to The White Hart Inn. George Yard Buildings, a block of tenement flats built in 1876, were on the western side of the alley, near the northern end to the back of Toynbee Hall. Pearly Poll and her client went to the parallel Angel Alley.

Murder

In the early hours of the following morning, a resident of the Buildings, one Mrs. Hewitt, was awoken by cries of "Murder!", but domestic violence and shouts of that nature were common in the area and she ignored the noise. At 2:00 a.m., two other residents, husband and wife Joseph and Elizabeth Mahoney, returned to the Buildings and saw no one on the stairs. At the same time, the patrolling beat officer, PC Thomas Barrett, questioned a grenadier loitering nearby, who replied that he was waiting for a friend. At 3:30 a.m., resident Albert George Crow returned home after a night's work as a cab driver and noticed Tabram's body lying on a landing above the first flight of stairs. The landing was so dimly lit that he mistook her for a sleeping vagrant and it was not until just before 5:00 a.m. that a resident coming down the stairs on his way to work, dock labourer John Saunders Reeves, realised she was dead.

Reeves fetched Barrett, who sent for Dr. Timothy Robert Killeen to examine the body. Killeen arrived at about 5:30 a.m. and estimated that Tabram had been dead for around 3 hours. Her killer had stabbed her 39 times in the body and neck, including nine times in the throat, five in the left lung, two in the right lung, one in the heart, five in the liver, two in the spleen, and six in the stomach, also wounding her lower abdomen and genitals. She was lying on her back and her clothing was raised to her middle, exposing her lower half, which indicated the body lay in a sexual position. Killeen, however, could supply no evidence of intercourse. The testimony of the residents and Dr Killeen indicated that Tabram was killed between 2:00 a.m. and 3:30 a.m. Residents had seen and heard nothing amiss between these times.

Investigation
The local inspector of the Metropolitan Police Force, Edmund Reid of H Division Whitechapel, was in charge of the investigation.  He arranged for PC Barrett to visit the Tower of London on 7 August in the hope that Barrett could identify the man he had seen standing in the street.  Barrett did not recognise any of the men. A parade of all the soldiers on leave on the night of the murder was arranged at the Tower on 8 August, and this time PC Barrett picked out a man. On being asked to re-examine his choice, Barrett picked out another man, and the first was allowed to leave.  Barrett explained his change of heart by stating that the man he had seen in George Yard had no medals, whereas the man he had selected at first did. Barrett's second choice, John Leary, claimed that on the night of the murder he had gone drinking in Brixton with a buddy, Private Law.  According to Leary, they had missed each other at closing time and he had gone for a walk before meeting up with Law in the Strand at about 4:30 a.m., whereupon they had another drink in Billingsgate before returning to the Tower.  Law was interviewed, separately from Leary, and his version of the night's events corresponded exactly with Leary's.  On the strength of their corroborating statements and because of Barrett's uncertain identification, Leary and Law were dismissed from the inquiry.

Another soldier from the Tower, Corporal Benjamin, who was absent without leave, was also dismissed from the investigation after it transpired that he had been visiting his father in Kingston-upon-Thames.

Connelly was not wholly cooperative with police and hid with a cousin for a while near Drury Lane, not coming forward until 9 August.  She missed an identity parade arranged at the Tower for 10 August, but attended the rescheduled one on the 13th.  Connelly failed to recognise the clients and claimed that the men that night had worn white cap-bands.  As such bands were worn only by the Coldstream Guards, rather than the Grenadier Guards at the Tower, Connelly was taken to another identity parade at Wellington Barracks on the 15th, where she picked out two soldiers, but both had solid alibis. One had been at home with his wife, while the other had been in the barracks.
Tabram's body was formally identified on 14 August by her estranged husband. At the time of her death she was wearing a black bonnet, a long black jacket, a dark green skirt, a brown petticoat and stockings, and spring-sided boots showing considerable wear. She was 5 feet 3 inches tall and had dark hair. The inquest into her death was concluded by deputy coroner for South-East Middlesex George Collier on 23 August at the Working Lad's Institute, Whitechapel Road, with a verdict of murder by person or persons unknown. No suspect was ever arrested for Tabram's murder.

Jack the Ripper
Contemporary newspaper reports published at the beginning of September linked Tabram's murder to those of Emma Elizabeth Smith on 3 April and Mary Ann Nichols on 31 August, though before she died, Smith had told the police that a gang had attacked her. The later killings of Annie Chapman on 8 September, of both Elizabeth Stride and Catherine Eddowes on 30 September and of Mary Jane Kelly on 9 November were also linked at the time to Tabram's. The last five murders mentioned are now generally referred to as the "canonical five" victims of Jack the Ripper. All were knife murders of impoverished prostitutes in the Whitechapel and Spitalfields districts, generally perpetrated in darkness in the small hours of the morning, in a secluded site to which the public could gain access, and which occurred on or close to a weekend or holiday.

The police did not connect the murder with Smith's, but they did connect her death with the later five murders. Later students of the Ripper murders have largely excluded Tabram from the list of Ripper victims, chiefly because her throat was not cut in the manner of later victims, nor was she eviscerated. This view was advanced by Sir Melville Macnaghten, Assistant Chief Constable of the Metropolitan Police Service Criminal Investigation Department, who implied that Tabram was murdered by an unidentified soldier or soldiers in an 1894 memorandum on the murders. Dr Killeen, who performed the post mortem on Tabram, strengthened this belief with his opinion that two weapons were used—one of Tabram's wounds, which penetrated the chest bone, was inflicted with a weapon longer and stouter than the others, a dagger or possibly a bayonet, while the others were inflicted with a shorter, slimmer knife.

Several 20th-century psychological reports have assumed Mary Ann Nichols to have been Jack the Ripper's first victim, but add that her murder was unlikely to have been his first attack. Some have suggested the Ripper may have murdered Tabram before perfecting his modus operandi of overpowering and cutting the throats of his victims. Other researchers, however, such as Philip Sugden in The Complete History of Jack the Ripper, and Sean Day in Peter Underwood's Jack the Ripper: One Hundred Years of Mystery, do view Tabram as a probable Ripper victim.

Sir Melville Macnaghten was only actively involved in the Whitechapel murders investigation between 1889 and 1891; thus, his notes reflect only the opinions of some police officers at the time and include several factual errors in the information presented pertaining to possible suspects. Serial killers have been known to have changed their murder weapons, but especially to develop their modus operandi over time, as the Ripper did with increasingly severe mutilations. While the five canonical Ripper murders were located roughly north, south, east and west of Whitechapel, Tabram's murder occurred close to their geographic centre. It is possible that her murder was one of the first committed by the Ripper before he had chosen his later modus operandi.

In 1998 an Australian researcher, Ted Linn, produced his findings in a booklet called The Case of the Redhanded Copycat, in which he outlines his case that Martha's husband, Henry Samuel Tabram, was the real Ripper.  He bases this on cryptographic clues he claims to have found in letters written by the Ripper and other evidence.

See also
 Cold case
 List of serial killers before 1900
 Unsolved murders in the United Kingdom

Notes

References

Bibliography
Begg, Paul (2003). Jack the Ripper: The Definitive History. London: Pearson Education. 
 Begg, Paul (2004). Jack the Ripper: The Facts. New York City: Barnes & Noble Books. 
Evans, Stewart P.; Rumbelow, Donald (2006). Jack the Ripper: Scotland Yard Investigates. Stroud, Gloucestershire: Sutton Publishing. 
Evans, Stewart P.; Skinner, Keith (2000). The Ultimate Jack the Ripper Sourcebook: An Illustrated Encyclopedia. London: Constable and Robinson. 
Fido, Martin (1987). The Crimes, Death and Detection of Jack the Ripper. Vermont: Trafalgar Square. 
 Honeycombe, Gordon (1982). The Murders of the Black Museum: 1870-1970, London: Bloomsbury Books, 
 Marriott, Trevor (2005). Jack the Ripper: The 21st Century Investigation. London: John Blake.

External links
 12 November 1888 Evening Star news article pertaining to the murder of Martha Tabram
 2009 The Daily Telegraph article detailing the victims of Jack the Ripper
 Casebook: Jack the Ripper
 The Whitechapel Murder Victims: Martha Tabram at whitechapeljack.com

1849 births
1880s murders in London
1888 deaths
1888 murders in the United Kingdom
19th-century English women
Deaths by stabbing in London
English murder victims
Female murder victims
Jack the Ripper victims
People from Southwark
People murdered in London
Women of the Victorian era